The men's triple jump at the 2014 IPC Athletics European Championships was held at the Swansea University Stadium from 18–23 August.

Medalists

Results

See also
List of IPC world records in athletics

References

triple jump